The 2020–21 Loyola Greyhounds men's basketball team represented Loyola University Maryland in the 2020–21 NCAA Division I men's basketball season. The Greyhounds, led by third-year head coach Tavaras Hardy, played their home games at Reitz Arena in Baltimore, Maryland as members of the Patriot League. With the creation of mini-divisions to cut down on travel due to the ongoing COVID-19 pandemic, they played in the South Division. They finished the season 6–11, 4–10 in Patriot League play to finish in last place in the South Division. In the Patriot League tournament, they advanced to the quarterfinals when Holy Cross was forced to forfeit due to COVID-19 issues. In the quarterfinals, they defeated Navy to advance to the semifinals where they defeated Army. In the championship game, they lost to Colgate.

Previous season
The Greyhounds finished the 2019–20 season 15–17, 7–11 in Patriot League play to finish in a tie for eighth place. They lost in the first round of the Patriot League tournament to Lehigh.

Roster

Schedule and results 

|-
!colspan=12 style=| Patriot League regular season

|-
!colspan=12 style=| Patriot League tournament
|-

|-

Source

References

Loyola Greyhounds men's basketball seasons
Loyola Greyhounds
Loyola Greyhounds men's basketball
Loyola Greyhounds men's basketball